Pericalymma is a group of plants in the myrtle family Myrtaceae described as a genus in 1840. The entire genus is endemic to Western Australia.

Species
 Pericalymma crassipes (Lehm.) Schauer 
 Pericalymma ellipticum (Endl.) Schauer 
 Pericalymma megaphyllum Cranfield
 Pericalymma spongiocaule Cranfield

formerly included
now in Kunzea 
 Pericalymma × roseum Turcz. - Kunzea × rosea (Turcz.) Govaerts 
 Pericalymma teretifolium Turcz. - Kunzea pauciflora Schauer

References

 
Myrtaceae genera
Endemic flora of Western Australia